2021 Slovenian Presidency of the Council of the European Union was Slovenia's second presidency of the Council held between 1 July and 31 December 2021. Slovenia held the first presidency from 1 January until 30 June 2008.

Slovenia is part of the 10th Presidency Trio, together with Germany and Portugal. This trio is the first in the second cycle of presidencies.

Head of the presidency was Anže Logar, Minister of Foreign Affairs of Slovenia.

Presidency trio

Political priorities 
Political priorities of the Slovenian presidency of the council was:

 The resilience, recovery and strategic autonomy of the European Union,
Conference on the Future of Europe,
A union of the European way of life, the rule of law and equal criteria for all, and
A credible and secure European Union, capable of ensuring security and stability in its neighbourhood

Presidents-in-Office of the Council

National government 

 President of the Republic Borut Pahor
 Prime Minister Janez Janša
 President of the National Assembly Igor Zorčič

Permanent mission to the EU

Venues 
Slovenian Presidency will be held at the following venues:

 Slovenia
 Brdo Castle, Kranj
 Brdo Congress Centre, Kranj
 Presidential Palace, Ljubljana
 National Assembly Building, Ljubljana
 Belgium
 Justus Lipsius Building, Brussels
 Europa Building, Brussels
 European Parliament, Brussels
 Luxembourg
 European Congress Centre, Luxembourg
 France
 European Parliament, Strasbourg

References 

2021 in politics
2021 in Slovenia
2021 in the European Union
Presidency of the Council of the European Union
Slovenia and the European Union